Norton Lees is a residential suburb in the Graves Park ward of the City of Sheffield, England located to the east of Woodseats.

History

Notable buildings in Norton Lees include Bishops' House—a half-timbered house that was built c. 1500—and St Paul's Church and Centre, Norton Lees, Sheffield, a parish church that was originally built in 1875-7 and extended in 1935, the octagonal spire of which is visible from more than 3 miles away.

Below Newfield school is the former site of Lees Hall, built in the 15th century, but demolished by the local council in the 1950s. The orchard and other features can still be found.

Modern development
Also in the area is the Thorpe House housing estate, a popular development built in the 1930s.  The tree-lined roads generous sized gardens, and numerous 3 bedroom semi detached house with gardens are popular with families of all ages through to retired people.

The Brindley council housing estate also lies alongside Warminster Road, built in 1976–1977. Unlike numerous other examples of council housing, built with row after row of identical houses, this estate was built with curving roads, open communal areas and footpaths and so was popular with tenants.  Many houses have converted to private ownership under the right to buy scheme.

Active8, an independent free magazine, is distributed in and around Norton Lees (and other areas of S8) every month, publicising local people, companies and community events.

Schools
Schools in this area include Newfield Secondary School, recently rebuilt after many years of inadequate classrooms and facilities, and Mundella Primary School on Derbyshire Lane.

Vista
Many parts of Norton Lees offer long views towards other parts of Sheffield. It is possible to see across the city centre towards Wincobank, Crookes, Hallam, and other outlying areas to the west, north and east.  This is especially so in Meersbrook Park, as many of the grassy areas have unrestricted views across the city. This view was painted by JMW Turner in 1797.

Notable residents

 Nick Robinson, origami artist

References

External links
 Mundella Primary School site
 Facebook residents page
 Bishops' House website
 Norton Lees history site

Suburbs of Sheffield